Luis Martínez-Fernández (born January 14, 1960) is a Cuban-born American historian, educator, and columnist, specializing in Cuban and Caribbean history and culture, education, and global contemporary history. He is Pegasus Professor of History at the University of Central Florida and a weekly syndicated columnist with Creators Syndicate.

The focus of his books ranges widely across centuries from Key to the New World: A History of Early Colonial Cuba to Revolutionary Cuba: A History to contemporary US and World events. He served as chief editor of the multiple-award winning Encyclopedia of Cuba: People, History Culture.

Early life and education 
Martínez-Fernández was born in Havana, Cuba in 1960, when the Cuban Revolution was entering its second year. In 1962, his family went into exile, settling briefly in Miami Beach then relocating to Lima Peru, until 1970, when his family moved to Puerto Rico. He attended the University of Puerto Rico (Río Piedras), where he studied under historians Fernando Picó and Andrés Ramos Mattei, earning B.A. and M.A. degrees in History. In 1986, Martínez-Fernández left Puerto Rico to attend Duke University, where he received a PhD in Latin American history (1990). His dissertation director was historian of colonial Latin America John TePaske.

Career 
Upon graduation from Duke, Martínez-Fernández joined the faculty of Augusta State University and later Colgate University, where he specialized in Caribbean and Latin American History. In 1994 he joined the Rutgers University faculty with a joint appointment in History and the Department of Puerto Rican and Hispanic Caribbean Studies, which he chaired between 1998 and 2004.

Since 2004, he has taught at the University of Central Florida, where he directed the Latin American Studies Program and founded the Latin American Cultural Festival of Central Florida. In 2021 he was awarded a Pegasus Professorship, UCF's highest academic honor.

Martínez-Fernández is also an award-winning columnist, whose op-eds have appeared in the Christian Science Monitor, The Miami Herald, and the Chronicle of Higher Education among other periodicals, and the online news venue The Globe Post. In 2020, he joined Creators Syndicate as weekly syndicated columnist.

Recognition, awards, and publications 
 National Society of Newspaper Columnists, Second place Award (online category), 2021.
 Pegasus Professorship, highest academic honor conferred to University of Central Florida faculty, 2021.
 Member of the Academia de la Historia de Cuba en el Exilio, inducted November 2020.
 Latino International Book Awards, Gold Medal, Best History Book, 2019.
 Florida Book Awards, Bronze Medal, General Nonfiction Category, 2018.
 University of Puerto Rico, Distinguished Alumnus Residing Abroad, 2002

Selected bibliography

References

External links 
 University webpage
 Personal webpage

1960 births
Living people
Cuban emigrants to Puerto Rico
Historians of Cuba
Historians of the Caribbean
Colgate University faculty
Writers from Havana
University of Puerto Rico, Río Piedras Campus alumni
Duke University alumni
Puerto Rican columnists
Writers from Lima
University of Central Florida faculty
20th-century Puerto Rican historians
20th-century American male writers
Rutgers University faculty
21st-century American historians
21st-century American male writers